is a Japanese economist. He is a professor of economics at Northwestern University and, since December 2018, the chief scientific adviser of the Tokyo Foundation for Policy Research. He is also international senior fellow at the Canon Institute of Global Studies. He was awarded the Nakahara Prize from the Japanese Economic Association in 1996 and was elected a fellow of the Econometric Society in 1999, and a fellow of the Society for the Advancement of Economic Theory in 2011.

Education 
After receiving his BA in International Relations from the University of Tokyo in 1980, he received a PhD in economics from Harvard in 1987.

Research 
Matsuyama’s main fields of research are international trade and macroeconomics. In particular, he has worked extensively on such topics as north-south trade, economic growth, economic development, income inequality, structural change, and endogenous economic fluctuations. He is, in his own words, “interested in understanding the mechanisms behind macroeconomic instability, structural transformation, as well as inequality across countries, regions, and households, and how they interact with credit market imperfections and product market innovations.”

References

External links 

 Kiminori Matsuyama, Department of Economics, Northwestern University
 Kiminori Matsuyama, Chief Scientific Adviser, Tokyo Foundation for Policy Research
Kiminori Matsuyama, Google Scholar
Kiminori Matsuyama, IDEAS

Harvard University alumni
Japanese economists
University of Tokyo alumni
Northwestern University faculty
Fellows of the Econometric Society
Living people
1957 births